Duffer Peak is the highest mountain in the Pine Forest Range of northwestern Humboldt County, Nevada, United States.  It ranks twenty-second among the most topographically prominent peaks in the state. The peak is located on public land managed by the Bureau of Land Management and thus has no access restrictions.

References 

Landforms of Humboldt County, Nevada
Mountains of Nevada